S. Shungrasoobyer  (1836–1904), also known as Sankara Subha Iyer or Sankara Stibbaiyar, was an Indian administrator who served as the Diwan of Travancore State from 1892 to 1898.

Early life 

Shungrasoobyer was born in 1836 in Travancore. His maternal grandfather was a pundit of the Appeal Court. Shungrasoobyer had his schooling at the Rajah's Free School, Trivandrum. On completion of his schooling in 1853, Shungrsoobyer joined the Travancore  state service as a teacher on a monthly salary of Rs. 5.

Civil service 

Shungrasoobyer's talents were spotted by the then Diwan, Sir T. Madhava Rao, who appointed him Deputy Sheristadar of Police.

In 1882, Shungrasoobyer was appointed Settlement Diwan Peishkar of the Revenue Settlement by the then Diwan, V. Ramiengar. He performed his job well, completing the settlement of Najanad, Trivandrum and Chirayinkil taluks. In 1888, Shungrasoobyer was nominated to the Travancore Legislative Assembly. he was ordered Sunday general holiday on 1894

Tenure as Diwan 

Travancore was witnessing a movement for Dalit upliftment at the time Shungrasoobyer became Diwan in 1892. There was no representation for the low-caste Hindu Ezhava community in the Travancore Legislative Council, constituted in 1888. Hence, in 1895, the Ezhavas presented a memorial to the Diwan demanding more political representation. They received no substantive response.

Later life and death 

Shungrasoobyer retired as Diwan in April 1898 on a monthly pension of Rs. 800. The Government of British India recognized  his services by making him a Companion of the Order of the Indian Empire. Sir Arthur Havelock, the Governor of Madras, appointed him a non-official member of the Madras Legislative Council.

Shungrasoobyer died in September 1904.

See also 
Padmanabhan Palpu

References 

Companions of the Order of the Indian Empire
Diwans of Travancore
1836 births
1904 deaths
Members of the Madras Legislative Council